The 2022 Uruguayan Segunda División was the season of second division professional of football in Uruguay. A total of 12 teams competed; the top two teams and the winner of the Championship play-offs were promoted to the Uruguayan Primera División.

Club information

Torneo Competencia

Group A

Group B

Final

Fase Regular

Promotion Playoffs

Semi-finals

First Leg

Second Leg

Finals

Relegation

Relegation Playoffs

First Leg

Second Leg

See also
2022 Uruguayan Primera División season
2022 Copa Uruguay

References

Uruguayan Segunda División seasons
2